The Independent National Electoral Commission (CENI) is the election commission in Guinea. The body was established in November 2007.

References

External links
Official website 

Elections in Guinea
Guinea
2007 establishments in Guinea